The DataHand is an unconventional computer keyboard introduced by 1990, by DataHand Systems, Inc, designed to be operated without any wrist motion or finger extension.

History
Datahand Systems, Inc. was founded in 1985. It was invented by Dale J. Retter and produced  as early as 1990. 

After the initial prototype was released in 1995, DataHand released the Professional and Professional II models with new bodies. The Professional II also has extended programming capabilities over the Professional, being able to record macros of keystrokes for convenient use.

DataHand Systems, Inc. announced in early 2008 that it was ceasing to sell its keyboards. The company web site states that due to supplier issues, the company will not sell the DataHand keyboard "until a new manufacturer can be identified". In January 2009, the company's website started taking orders for a "limited number of new DataHand Pro II units. Circa 19 April 2010, DataHand were out of stock.

Layout
It consists of two separate "keyboards", one for the left hand and one for the right. Each finger activates five buttons: the four compass directions as well as down. The thumbs also have five buttons: one inside, two outside, up and down.

The layout is initially similar to a QWERTY keyboard, but the middle two columns of keys (i.e. H,Y,G...) have been delegated to sideways finger movements, and all of the keys outside of the main three rows are accessed through two additional modes, including a mode for mousing. There are three primary modes all together: letters, number and symbols, and function / mouse mode. Some practice is required. However, eventual typing speedups are possible.

Rather than being spring-loaded, the buttons are held in place with magnets and are activated using optical sensors. This was done in order to reduce the finger workload while still giving tactile feedback. The button modules in which the fingers rest are adjustable—each side can be independently moved vertically or forward and back.".

In popular culture 
 The keyboard was seen in the 1997 sci-fi movie Contact as the controls for a spaceship.
 It appears in the 2006 spy movie Stormbreaker.
 The Industrial Innovations version was featured on the television series Mighty Morphin Power Rangers.
 A black model is used by Agent Grasso while searching for Amanda Givens' Jeep in Shadow Conspiracy (1997).
 Several boxes of the keyboard are seen in Teddy KGB's office near the end of the film Rounders (film) (1998).

See also 
 Keyboard technology
 List of human-computer interaction topics
 Computer keyboard
 Ergonomic keyboard
 Computer accessibility
 Carpal tunnel syndrome
 Repetitive strain injury
 Adaptive technology

References

External links 
 DataHand.com (1996-11-02) web.archive.org
 DataHand documentation Bill Buxton microsoft
 DataHand at Typing FAQ
 How-To disassemble and clean the DataHand
 DataHand keyboard Images
 Review by DataHand owner, with photos of older models
 Review by Jan Goyvaerts (August 6, 2007)
 Review update by Jan Goyvaerts (posted January 7, 2008)
 Review by Robyn Peterson in ExtremeTech (April 22, 2003)
 Review by David Madison
 Review by Paul Fatula @ ATPM (May, 2001)
 Evaluation by G Martin (June 10, 1994)
 Evaluation by Cliff Lasser (August 20, 1992)
 Review by Bryan Rosner, BioMed Publishers (November 11, 2008)

Computer keyboard models
Physical ergonomics
Computer accessibility